Michael Owen Ashton (born 23 March 1982) is a New Zealand makeup artist, hairstylist, beauty expert, and brand founder. 
He is recognized for having created the makeup look and eyeliner of recording artist Adele for the cosmetic house of Marc Jacobs Beauty, owned by Kendo group – LVMH. He is currently CEO and Creative Director of his eponymous cosmetics brand, Michael Ashton Beauty.

Early life 
Ashton was born in Hamilton, New Zealand. At the age of nine, he discovered his mother’s Nutrimetics case, wet/dry eyeshadow, and hot rollers. He then talked his grandmother into letting him do her makeup backstage when she performed with his uncle Sir Howard Morrison.

Ashton went to Katikati Primary School, Waimata Primary School, and Bethlehem College. He taught himself how to use makeup from Keyvn Aucoin’s book ‘Making Faces'.

He later trained at Servilles Academy of Hairdressing before working at a high-profile salon in Auckland and moving into session styling. He also spent time in New York working alongside the MAC Cosmetics Pro Team and doing the show circuits around Europe.

Career
Ashton first started working with celebrities when Girls Aloud and Jamelia came to New Zealand on promotional trips. He then started traveling to New York working alongside the M.A.C. Pro team with Gordon Espinet. When he first moved to London in 2006, he assisted Dick Page on the show circuit both in the U.K. and Europe. Through a friend in PR, he was connected to and worked with Bianca Jagger and Elle McPherson and subsequently began to focus on the red carpet.

In 2007, Ashton was introduced to Adele through a mutual friend in the lead-up to the release of her first album, 19. Later, Ashton became Adele's personal makeup artist for 12 years.

Clients 
Ashton's clientele include Alessandra Ambrosio, Adele, Nicole Scherzinger, Jing Lusi from Crazy Rich Asians, Penelope Cruz
 and Rosie Huntington Whiteley.

Magazine covers
Ashton styled the looks of Adele in 2015 Time Magazine 

Ashton created a red carpet look for Adele’s Grammy Awards 2017. The look was featured 12 times in fashion magazines including VOGUE, Allure, ELLE, BRIT+co, Hello! Magazine, Cosmopolitan, Hollywood Life and US Weekly.

Brand Collaborations 
Ashton is the "Global Artistry Ambassador" for Marc Jacobs Beauty from 2017 to 2019, including Sarah Tanno (who did Lady Gaga's Super Bowl makeup) and Hung Vanngo, who were joining the same time.

Awards 
Winner of the Wella Young Protege Scholarship 2000.

References

Beauticians
1982 births
Living people